

Mikhail Spiridonovich Gvozdev (– after 1759) was a Russian military geodesist and a commander of the expedition to northern Alaska in 1732, when the Alaskan shore was sighted by Russians for the first time.

In 1732, together with the participants of the First Kamchatka expedition navigators Ivan Fyodorov and K. Moshkov, Gvozdev sailed to Dezhnev Cape, the easternmost point of Asia, in the St. Gabriel (Sviatoi Gavriil). From there, after having replenished the water supply on 5 August, the St. Gabriel sailed east and soon came near the American mainland at Cape Prince of Wales. They charted the northwestern coast of Alaska and mapped their route. By doing this, Fyodorov and Gvozdev completed the discovery of the Bering Strait, once started by Semyon Dezhnyov and Fedot Alekseyev and continued by Bering.

Subsequently in 1741–1742, Gvozdev participated in an expedition led by Alexey Shelting and mapped most of the western and southern shores of the Sea of Okhotsk, as well as the eastern shore of Sakhalin.

Legacy
A cape on Sakhalin is named after Gvozdev.

References

18th-century people from the Russian Empire
1700s births
1760s deaths
Bering Strait
Explorers from the Russian Empire
Explorers of Alaska
Explorers of Asia
Russian explorers of North America
Russian geodesists